The Jin-Zuan Night Market is a night market in Cianjhen District, Kaohsiung, Taiwan. Together with the adjacent Kaisyuan Night Market, they form the largest night market in Taiwan.

History
The night market was opened in July 2013.

Features
The night market is shaped into a large constellation for easy visitor navigation around the vendors. It covers an area of 30,000 m2 with over 500 of stalls offering a wide variety of Taiwanese food, drinks and goods. The parking lot offers spaces for 500 cars and 1,000 scooters.

Transportation
The night market is accessible within walking distance North East of Kaisyuan Station of Kaohsiung MRT. The night market also provides complementary shuttle bus service that runs every five minutes interval from the station to the market.

See also
 Night markets in Taiwan
 List of night markets in Taiwan

References

2013 establishments in Taiwan
Buildings and structures completed in 2013
Night markets in Kaohsiung